Gauger is a surname of German origin, meaning "to wander around or roam", referring to a vagrant or traveler. Notable people with the surname include:

Gary Gauger (born 1952), American man wrongfully convicted of murder
Martin Gauger (1905-1941), German jurist and pacifist
Stephane Gauger (1970-2018), Vietnamese-born American film director, screenwriter, and cinematographer

See also
Gager (disambiguation)
Gauer